Tumarapi is a location in the La Paz Department in Bolivia. It is the seat of the Waldo Ballivián Municipality, the sixth municipal section of the Pacajes Province.

References 

Populated places in La Paz Department (Bolivia)